Mikhail Aleksandrovich Dudin (– 31 December 1993) was a Soviet poet. Mikhail Aleksandrovich Dudin (November 7 [20], 1916, Klevnevo village, Nerekhtsky district, Kostroma province, Russian Empire - December 31, 1993, St. Petersburg, Russia) - Russian Soviet prose writer, poet, translator and journalist, war correspondent. Public figure, screenwriter, author of lyrics and over 70 books of poetry. Hero of Socialist Labor (1976), laureate of the USSR State Prize (1981).

References

External links
 Mikhail Dudin in Poetry Library.ru

1916 births
1993 deaths
People from Furmanovsky District
People from Nerekhtsky Uyezd
Communist Party of the Soviet Union members
Soviet male poets
Soviet poets
Soviet military personnel of the Winter War
Soviet military personnel of World War II
Recipients of the USSR State Prize
Heroes of Socialist Labour